Rod "Roddy" Jones (14 June 1946 - 4 May 2022) was a Welsh former professional footballer. A striker, he joined Newport County in 1969 from local club Lovells Athletic. He went on to make 288 appearances for Newport scoring 65 goals. In 1979, he joined Barry Town.

References

External links

Welsh footballers
Newport County A.F.C. players
English Football League players
Living people
Lovell's Athletic F.C. players
1946 births
Association football forwards
Barry Town United F.C. players